Francisco Adolfo Marcos-Marín (born June 20, 1946, Madrid) is a Spanish linguist, an emeritus professor of Linguistics and Translation at the University of Texas at San Antonio. Previously he was professore ordinario per chiara fama in the Università di Roma 'La Sapienza', catedrático de Lingüística General at the Universidad Autónoma de Madrid and catedrático de Historia del Español at the Universidad de Valladolid. He is a Corresponding Fellow of Academia Norteamericana de la Lengua Española and Academia Argentina de Letras, and an Honorary Citizen of San Antonio, Texas.

Professional Achievements 
Recipient of the Humboldt Research Award (2004). Academic Director of Instituto Cervantes (1999–2001). Director of the area of Language Industries at the Spanish National Agency for the Development of Programs for the Quincentennial (1990–1992). UNESCO Consultant in Beijing (PR China, 1981). Coordinator of the Reference Corpora of Contemporary Spanish in Argentina and Chile, and of the Oral Corpus of Centro-Peninsular Spanish. Scientific Co-Director of ADMYTE, Digital Archive of Spanish Manuscripts and Texts. Director of the Argentina-Spain cooperation project for the preparation of the Catálogo de la Colección Foulché-Delbosc of the Biblioteca Nacional de la República Argentina and its electronic edition. Member of the Scientific Committee of the Diccionario del Español Medieval (Heidelberger Akademie der Wissenschaften.) Membro del Consiglio Scientifico, Progetto Lingua Italiana Dante Alighieri, Società Dante Alighieri, Italy. Member of several evaluation committees in Argentina, Austria, Egypt, European Union, Germany, Italy, Spain, Tunisia and the United States. In 2015 he was appointed as an Expert of the European Research Council.

The author of more than thirty printed books and more than three hundred papers and reviews published in specialized journals, collective volumes or Festschriften, in several countries in different languages. He has presented more than two hundred communications at international conferences and delivered more than one hundred specialized seminars or workshops in different countries. He has also published two books of poetry and several short stories, and has contributed widely to American, Latin-American and Spanish newspapers, radio and TV broadcasts.

References

Bibliography

Scholarly 
 "Poesía Narrativa Arabe y Epica Hispánica" (1971)
 "Aproximación a la Gramática Española" (1972)
 "Lingüística y Lengua Española" (1975)
 "El Comentario Lingüístico (Metodología y Práctica)" (1977)
 "Estudios sobre el Pronombre" (1978)
 "Reforma y modernización del Español (Ensayo de Sociolingüística Histórica)" (1979)
 "Curso de Gramática Española" (1980)
 "Literatura Castellana Medieval. De las Jarchas a Alfonso X" (1980)
 "Metodología del Español como Lengua Segunda"" (1983)
 "Comentarios de Lengua Española"  (1983)
 "Cantar de Mio Cid. Edición modernizada, estudio y notas" (1984)
 "Libro de Alexandre. Estudio y edición" (1987)
 "Lingüística Aplicada" with Jesús Sánchez Lobato (1988)
 "Introducción a la Lingüística: Historia y Modelos" (1990)
 "Conceptos básicos de política lingüística para España" (1994)
 "Informática y Humanidades" (1994)
 "El Comentario Filológico con Apoyo Informático" (1996)
 "Cantar de Mio Cid. Edición. (Introducción, Edición Crítica, Versión en Español moderno y notas)" (1997)
 "Gramática española" with F. Javier Satorre Grau & María Luisa Viejo Sánchez (1998)
 "Guía de gramática de la lengua española" with Paloma España Ramírez (2001)
 "Los retos del español" (2006)
 "Se habla español" with Amando de Miguel (2009)
 "Más allá de la ortografía. La primera ortografía hispánica" with Paloma España Ramírez (2009)

Poetry 
 "Odysseos" (1999)
 "Lectura de su pluma" (2002)

External links 
Access to publications
Expert profile, ELSNET
Humboldt Award
Francisco Marcos Marín, Blog

1946 births
Living people
University of Texas at San Antonio faculty
Linguists from Spain
Spanish scientists
Spanish male writers